Arrighi is a surname. Notable people with the surname include:

Christine Arrighi, French politician
Ernest Arrighi de Casanova, French Bonapartist politician
Gianluca Arrighi, Italian novelist
Giovanni Arrighi, Italian sociologist
Giuseppe Arrighi, Italian painter 
Jean-Toussaint Arrighi de Casanova, French general
Luciana Arrighi, Australian production designer
Ludovico Vicentino degli Arrighi, papal scribe and type designer in Renaissance Italy
Nike Arrighi, French visual artist and former actress
Pascal Arrighi, French politician